Claudio Andrés Salinas Ponce (born April 24, 1976 in Valparaiso, Chile) is a former Chilean footballer who played for clubs of Chile, Brazil, Canada and Switzerland.

Career
In 2004, he moved to Canada and joined Edmonton Aviators alongside his compatriots Jaime Lo Presti and Enzo Ferrari.

Teams
  Everton 1994–1999
  Colo-Colo 2000–2001
  Everton 2002–2003
  Santiago Wanderers 2003
  Edmonton Aviators 2004
  Zürich 2004
  Deportes Puerto Montt 2004
  Unión La Calera 2005
  Vasco da Gama 2006–2007
  San Luis 2008
  Santiago Wanderers 2009

Titles
  Santiago Wanderers 1995 (Chilean Primera B Championship)

References

 
 Claudio Salinas at MemoriaWanderers 

1976 births
Living people
Sportspeople from Valparaíso
Chilean footballers
Chilean expatriate footballers
Everton de Viña del Mar footballers
Colo-Colo footballers
Santiago Wanderers footballers
Edmonton Aviators / F.C. players
FC Zürich players
Puerto Montt footballers
Unión La Calera footballers
CR Vasco da Gama players
San Luis de Quillota footballers
Primera B de Chile players
Chilean Primera División players
A-League (1995–2004) players
Swiss Super League players
Campeonato Brasileiro Série A players
Chilean expatriate sportspeople in Canada
Chilean expatriate sportspeople in the United States 
Chilean expatriate sportspeople in Switzerland
Chilean expatriate sportspeople in Brazil
Expatriate soccer players in Canada
Expatriate soccer players in the United States
Expatriate footballers in Switzerland
Expatriate footballers in Brazil
Association football defenders